Robert Baker Dairyu Chotan Aitken Rōshi (June 19, 1917 – August 5, 2010) was a Zen teacher in the Harada-Yasutani lineage. He co-founded the Honolulu Diamond Sangha in 1959
together with his wife, Anne Hopkins Aitken. Aitken received Dharma transmission from Koun Yamada in 1985 but decided to live as a layperson. He was a socialist advocating social justice for homosexuals, women and Native Hawaiians throughout his life, and was one of the original founders of the Buddhist Peace Fellowship.

Biography

Robert Aitken or Bob, as he liked to be called, was born to Robert Thomas Aitken and Gladys Page Baker in Philadelphia, Pennsylvania in 1917. He was raised in Hawaii from the age of five. He was the son of a war enthusiast and was a rebel and loner in the 1930s and 40s before the war.

Living in Guam as a civilian working in construction—at the onset of World War II—he was detained by the Japanese and held in internment camps for the duration of the war. A guard at one of the internment camps let him borrow a copy of R.H. Blyth's book Zen in English Literature and the Oriental Classics. In one of his books later on in his life, he described being so invested in the book that he managed to be joyful even in the terrible conditions. In another internment camp in Kobe, Japan in 1944 he met its author, Reginald Horace Blyth, with whom he had frequent discussions on Zen Buddhism and anarchism. At the conclusion of the war he returned to Hawaii and obtained a B.A. in English literature and an MA in Japanese from the University of Hawaii. He would write for two hours each morning and even read aloud his work to make sure it was his distinctive style.

In the late 1940s, while going to classes briefly at the University of California in Berkeley, California, he met Nyogen Senzaki.  Originally in California hoping for an encounter with Krishnamurti, he began to study with Senzaki in Los Angeles. It was during this period that his commitment to leftist social issues - such as pacifism and labor rights – became more vocal. As a result of his advocacy, he was investigated during this period by the FBI. Because he was against the war in Vietnam and against the arming the military, he decided to not pay his percent of taxes that went to the Defense Department of the U.S.

In 1950 he went back to Japan, under a grant to study haiku and followed Senzaki's recommendation that he study Zen there. There he took part in his first sesshin at Engaku-ji, a temple in Kamakura, Japan. Soon after, he met Nakagawa Soen, who persuaded him to come for a stay at Ryutakuji for the next seven months. During this period Soen took over for the ailing abbot of the temple, Yamamoto Gempo. Aitken then came down with a case of dysentery, and returned home to Hawaii. He married his second wife Anne Hopkins in 1957 and made occasional trips back to Japan. In  1957 Aitken met Hakuun Yasutani and sat with him for the first time.

In 1959 he and Anne began a meditation group in Honolulu at their residence, which became known as the Koko-an zendo. The community that gathered at this zendo were then named the Diamond Sangha by the two. The Diamond Sangha has affiliate zen centers in South America, Australia, New Zealand, the United States and Europe and is known for making the rigors of traditional Zen accessible to lay practitioners.

In 1960 Soen Nakagawa Roshi asked young monk Eido Tai Shimano to travel to Honolulu to assist at the Diamond Sangha center.

In 1961, Aitken made an extended stay in Japan to study under Haku'un Yasutani, eventually ending his studies with Soen. He then worked in various capacities at the East-West Center and the University of Hawaii until 1969, when he and Anne moved to Maui, Hawaii to found the Maui Zendo in Haiku-Pauwela. Koun Yamada Rōshi was invited to lead the Diamond Sangha and he moved to Hawaii in 1971. In 1974 Aitken was given permission to teach by Koun Yamada, receiving full Dharma transmission from him in 1985.

He also was a major inspiration for the ‘System Stinks’ movement, where they drew inspiration from his famous photograph protesting with a sign. In the picture the sign said 'The System Stinks' and was in protest of the Iraq War, while in his wheelchair. The photo was taken in Hawaii.

Robert Aitken was a social activist through much of his adult life, beginning with protesting against nuclear testing during the 1940s. He was an outspoken critic of the Vietnam War, and became a strong opponent of the nuclear arms race between the United States and the Soviet Union. He was among the earlier proponents of deep ecology in religious America, and was outspoken in his beliefs on the equality of men and women. In 1978 Aitken helped found the Buddhist Peace Fellowship, an organization that advocates conflict resolution globally. In the discussion that led to the founding of the Buddhist Peace Fellowship, most of the other people had less experience than him when it came to political activism. This gave him the most influence on what the organization should be about. Many of the first 100 people who were sent invitations to join were recommendations from Robert Aitken. He was also the guest speaker at the first two institutes that the Buddhist Peace Fellowship held. He did have anarchist beliefs, which is why even when he helped found the organization, he didn't take any control due to distrusting all authority or control even when it was his own.

Aitken Roshi died after a brief bout with pneumonia on August 5, 2010 in Honolulu, Hawaii. He was working on his fourteenth book before his passing. He retired in 1996 and spent some of his final years in Palolo, Hawaii where he could be looked after and interact with some of his students.

Bibliography
Zen Training. A Personal Account; Honolulu: Old Island Books (1960).
A Buddhist Reader; Honolulu: Young Buddhist Association (1961).
Hawaii Upward Bound Writing and Art 1966; A Project of the Office of Economic Opportunity. Robert Aitken, Editor (1966).
A Zen Wave: Basho's Haiku and Zen; New York: Weatherhill (1978). 
Taking the Path of Zen; San Francisco: North Point Press (1982). .
The Mind of Clover: Essays in Zen Buddhist Ethics; San Francisco: North Point Press (1984). .
The Gateless Barrier: The Wu-menkuan (Mumonkan); San Francisco: North Point Press (1990). .
The Dragon who Never Sleeps: Verses for Zen Buddhist Practice; Berkeley: Parallax Press (1992). .
Encouraging Words: Zen Buddhist Teachings for Western Students; San Francisco and New York: Pantheon Books (1993).    .
The Ground We Share: Everyday Practice. Buddhist and Christian with David Steindl-Rast; Ligouri, Missouri: Triumph Books, (1994). .
The Practice of Perfection: The Paramitas from a Zen Buddhist Perspective; San Francisco and New York: Pantheon Books (1994). .
Original Dwelling Place: Zen Buddhist Essays; Washington, DC: Counterpoint Press (1996). .
Zen Master Raven: Sayings and Doings of a Wise Bird; Boston: Tuttle Publishing (2002). 
A Zen Master:  Counterpoint 2008 ISBN 978-1-58243-536-7

See also 
 Buddhism in the United States
 Buddhism in the West
 Buddhist Peace Fellowship
 Engaged Buddhism
List of peace activists
 Timeline of Zen Buddhism in the United States

Footnotes

References

External links
 
 Robert Aitken's blog
 Aitken Collection at the University of Hawaii's Hamilton Library
 Honolulu Diamond Sangha
 Buddhist Peace Fellowship

1917 births
2010 deaths
American anti-war activists
American pacifists
American prisoners of war in World War II
 American Buddhists
American scholars of Buddhism
American spiritual writers
American Zen Buddhist spiritual teachers
Buddhist pacifists
Converts to Buddhism
Deaths from pneumonia in Hawaii
Engaged Buddhists
English-language haiku poets
Non-interventionism
People from Honolulu
Sanbo Kyodan Buddhists
University of California, Berkeley alumni
University of Hawaiʻi at Mānoa alumni
University of Hawaiʻi at Mānoa faculty
World War II civilian prisoners held by Japan
World War II prisoners of war held by Japan
Writers from Philadelphia
Zen Buddhism writers